Hello Singapore (Chinese: 狮城有约) is a news/current affairs programme produced by Mediacorp Channel 8.

History
The show replaced the current weekday broadcast of Singapore Today as well as half of the 7.00pm drama timeslot, airing weekdays from 6.30pm, premiering together with socio-drama , Healing Hands at 7.30pm. 

A repeat telecast of "Crosstalks" and the topic of the day will also be available the next weekday, 7.30am to 8.00am. Hello Singapore ended its broadcast at Caldecott Hill on 10 March 2017. On 13 March 2017, it was then moved to Mediacorp Campus at 1 Stars Avenue.

Background
The series is a weekday news/current affairs programme that will better reflect the sentiments and concerns of Singaporeans, combining news, current affairs and live discussions. It also features news coverage around the world and in-depth analyses of current affairs, through pre-recorded segments and live discussions with invited experts and guests.

See also
Channel 8 (Singaporean TV channel)
8world

References

Current affairs shows
Singaporean television news shows
2014 Singaporean television series debuts
Channel 8 (Singapore) original programming